The Pelham Commercial Historic District is a  historic district in Pelham, Georgia that was listed on the National Register of Historic Places in 1983. It included 48 contributing buildings a few of which are Carnegie Library of Pelham, a Carnegie library, Hand Trading Company, an "extraordinary" four-story commercial-style building, and two brick railroad depots.

References

Historic districts on the National Register of Historic Places in Georgia (U.S. state)
Italianate architecture in Georgia (U.S. state)
National Register of Historic Places in Mitchell County, Georgia
Buildings designated early commercial in the National Register of Historic Places